Stovepipe Wells is a way-station in the northern part of Death Valley, in unincorporated Inyo County, California.

Geography and names
Eventually, the road meets Panamint Valley Road at Panamint Junction in the Panamint Valley. East on SR 190 the road leads to Furnace Creek and Death Valley Junction.

Variant names listed for the Inyo County location by USGS include Stove Pipe Wells Hotel and Stovepipe Wells Hotel. The US Postal Service ZIP Code is 92328, and the locale name is spelled Stove Pipe Wells in some postal renditions. It is commonly referred to as Stovepipe Wells Village.

Climate
According to the Köppen Climate Classification system, Stovepipe Wells has a hot desert climate, abbreviated "BWh" on climate maps. Its average high temperature is greater than 100 °F from June through September.

History
The first temporary settlement at Stovepipe Wells came into being when a road between Rhyolite and Skidoo was begun in 1906 to ameliorate the approach to the mine at Skidoo. A collection of tents was erected to serve travelers with food, drink and lodging. During the bonanza days of Rhyolite and Skidoo, it was the only known water source on the Cross-Valley road. When sand obscured the spot, a length of stovepipe was inserted as a marker; hence, its unique name.

In 1925, entrepreneur Bob Eichmann began construction of the hotel at Stovepipe Wells, along with a scenic toll road through Death Valley. This marked the beginning of the transition from mining community to tourist destination.

The settlement is now registered as California Historical Landmark #826.

Facilities
Stovepipe Wells Village is home to the Stovepipe Wells Hotel, a full-service hotel with swimming pool. A general store offers sundries and food and is adjacent to a gas station. Stovepipe Wells Village also houses the Badwater Saloon and Toll Road restaurant, The Nugget Gift Shop and a ranger station.

The default format for wired telephone numbers in the community is in the Death Valley exchange: (760) 786-xxxx. The community had manual telephone service until the late 1980s.

The community is contained within the Great Basin Unified Air Pollution Control District.

Nearby features

 Close to town are some fairly large and accessible stationary sand dunes on the floor of Death Valley. They are located in the space between Salt Creek and Emigrant Wash.
The airport has an identifier of L09 and features a  paved runway.
Stovepipe Wells Campground 
Stovepipe Wells Ranger Station
Mesquite Flat Sand Dunes
Mosaic Canyon
Tucki Mountain
Grotto Canyon
Devil's Corn Field

California Historical Landmarks
There are three California Historical Landmarks in Stovepipe Wells.

California Historical Landmark number 826, Old Stovepipe Wells, founded on August 7, 1968 reads:
NO. 826 OLD STOVEPIPE WELLS - This waterhole, the only one in the sand dune area of Death Valley, was at the junction of the two Indian trails. During the bonanza days of Rhyolite and Skidoo, it was the only known water source on the cross-valley road. When sand obscured the spot, a length of stovepipe was inserted as a marker.

California Historical Landmark number 848, Eichbaum Toll Road, founded on May 19, 1971 reads:
NO. 848 EICHBAUM TOLL ROAD - In 1926, H. W. Eichbaum obtained a franchise for a toll road from Darwin Falls to Stovepipe Wells, the first maintained road into Death Valley from the west. It changed the area's economic base from mining to tourism and brought about the creation of Death Valley National Monument seven years later

California Historical Landmark number 441, Burned Wagons Point, founded on October 24, 1949 reads:
NO. 441 BURNED WAGONS POINT - Near this monument, the Jayhawker group of Death Valley '49ers, gold seekers from the Middle West who entered Death Valley in 1849 seeking a short route to the mines of central California, burned their wagons, dried the meat of some oxen and, with surviving animals, struggled westward on foot.

Gallery

See also
California Historical Landmarks in Inyo County
History of California through 1899

Sources

 7350.7U Location Identifiers, The National Flight Data Center, Federal Aviation Administration ATPUBS, US Department of Transportation, September 1, 2005.
 Map: Stovepipe Wells, California 7.5-minute quadrangle, US Geological Survey, 1988.
 National Geographic Names Database, US Geological Survey, 1995.
 California Air Resources Board web site.
 Richard E. Lingenfelter. (1988) Death Valley and the Amargosa: A Land of Illusion: University of California Press. p. 290, p. 475.

External links

 Stovepipe Wells Village web site
 National Park Service: Official Death Valley National Park website

Death Valley
Death Valley National Park
Populated places in the Mojave Desert
Unincorporated communities in California
Unincorporated communities in Inyo County, California
California Historical Landmarks